Ashleigh Barty defeated Karolína Plíšková in the final, 7–6(7–1), 6–3 to win the women's singles tennis title at the 2019 Miami Open. It was Barty's first WTA Premier Mandatory title. She entered the top 10 in the WTA rankings for the first time with the win.

Sloane Stephens was the defending champion, but lost in the third round to Tatjana Maria.

Naomi Osaka retained the WTA No. 1 singles ranking after Simona Halep lost in the semifinals. Petra Kvitová, Angelique Kerber, and Elina Svitolina were also in contention for the top ranking.

Seeds
All seeds received a bye into the second round.

Draw

Finals

Top half

Section 1

Section 2

Section 3

Section 4

Bottom half

Section 5

Section 6

Section 7

Section 8

Qualifying

Seeds

Qualifiers

Lucky losers

Qualifying draw

First qualifier

Second qualifier

Third qualifier

Fourth qualifier

Fifth qualifier

Sixth qualifier

Seventh qualifier

Eighth qualifier

Ninth qualifier

Tenth qualifier

Eleventh qualifier

Twelfth qualifier

References

External Links
 Main Draw
 Qualifying Draw

2019 WTA Tour
Women's Singles